Esko Rautionaho (born 23 September 1950) is a Finnish former ski jumper. He competed at the 1972 Winter Olympics and the 1976 Winter Olympics. His daughter is ski jumper Jenny Rautionaho.

World Cup

Standings

References

External links

1950 births
Living people
Finnish male ski jumpers
Olympic ski jumpers of Finland
Ski jumpers at the 1972 Winter Olympics
Ski jumpers at the 1976 Winter Olympics
People from Rovaniemi
Sportspeople from Lapland (Finland)
20th-century Finnish people